Edward Louis Grady (August 31, 1923 – December 10, 2012) was an American stage, film and television actor and teacher.

Early life
Grady was born to Eddie Jones Grady and Maude Clara (née Hodges) Grady on August 31, 1923, in Kinston, North Carolina. He graduated from Grainger High School in Kinston. Grady enlisted in the Army Air Force during World War II and trained as a cryptographer. He served on Ie Shima (Iejima) during the war, and was awarded the Soldier's Medal for rescuing the pilot of a P-47 which was on fire.

Grady received a Bachelor of Arts degree in theater and English from the University of North Carolina at Chapel Hill (UNC) after World War II. He was the member of the Carolina Playmakers at the Playmakers Theatre while studying at UNC. Grady later became an English teacher in New York City, where he also taught a photo workshop held at Columbia University.

Acting and teaching
Grady's film credits included A Simple Twist of Fate in 1994, Lolita in 1997, and The Notebook in 2004. His television roles included the 1993 television miniseries, Alex Haley's Queen; the 1993 Hallmark Hall of Fame television movie, To Dance with the White Dog; as well as a string of series including In the Heat of the Night, I'll Fly Away, Matlock, and Dawson's Creek, in which he had a recurring role as Gramps Ryan.

Grady's theater roles included three seasons at Unto These Hills, an outdoor Cherokee historical drama staged in Cherokee, North Carolina. Grady portrayed Drowning Bear in the play, which follows the story of the Eastern Band of Cherokee Indians.

In addition to acting, Grady taught television production and English at Freedom High School in Morganton, North Carolina, during the 1970s and Keenan High School in Columbia, South Carolina. He was a resident of Columbia, South Carolina.

Death and legacy
Ed Grady died at Palmetto Health Richland hospital in Columbia, South Carolina, on December 10, 2012, at the age of 89. His first wife, Jayne Elliott Grady, had died previously. He was survived by his second wife of twenty-seven years, Carolyn F. Ramsay; two children, Marta and Sean; and two stepchildren, Caroline Hattrich and Stephen Hattrich.

Filmography

Wolfman (1979) - Reverend Leonard
Lady Grey (1980) - Hubbard Jackson
Reuben, Reuben (1983) - Dr. William Ormsby
The Last Game (1984) - John Gant
D.A.R.Y.L. (1985) - Mr. Bergen
Unmasking the Idol (1986) - Male Prisoner
From the Hip (1987) - Baxter
Born to Race (1988) - Paul
Days of Our Lives (1989, TV) - Minister
Chattahoochee (1989) - Stream of Consciousness Man
Black Rainbow (1989) - Editor, Geoff McBain
Escape (1989) - Hobo #1
The Handmaid's Tale (1990) - Old Man
Modern Love (1990) - Judge
The Lost Capone (1990, TV Movie) - Sam Ellroy
Not Without My Daughter (1991) - Grandpa
Paris Trout (1991) - Judge Travis
The Perfect Tribute (1991, TV Movie) - Doctor Stone
Night of the Hunter (1991, TV Movie) - Walt
Wild Hearts Can't Be Broken (1991) - Preacher
Children of the Corn II: The Final Sacrifice (1992) - Dr. Appleby
Consenting Adults (1992) - Mr. Watkins
Alex Haley's Queen (1993, TV) - Doctor
The Young Indiana Jones Chronicles (1993, TV) - Professor Hunt
Bandit: Bandit Goes Country (1994, TV Movie) - Preacher
The Yearling (1994, TV Movie) - Doc Wilson
Oldest Living Confederate Widow Tells All (1994, TV Movie) - Robert E. Lee
A Simple Twist of Fate (1994) - Judge Marcus
Tad (1995, TV Movie) - Seward 
Children of the Corn III: Urban Harvest (1995) - Dr. Appleby
The Closest Thing to Heaven (1996) - George
Lolita (1997) - Dr. Melinik
 Dawson's Creek (1998, TV) - Gramps Ryan
Morgan's Ferry (2001) - Ferry Master
New Best Friend (2002) - Alicia's Doctor
The Notebook (2004) - Harry

References

External links

 Ed Grady screenplay collection at the University of South Carolina Irvin Department of Rare Books and Special Collections.

1923 births
2012 deaths
American male film actors
American male stage actors
American male television actors
Recipients of the Soldier's Medal
United States Army Air Forces personnel of World War II
Columbia University faculty
Male actors from North Carolina
Male actors from South Carolina
Male actors from Columbia, South Carolina
People from Kinston, North Carolina
University of North Carolina at Chapel Hill alumni
Schoolteachers from North Carolina
20th-century American male actors
21st-century American male actors